John Joyce (1933–2004) was a British folk musician.  He dedicated his musical career to the twelve-string guitar.  Blues was his first love and he appeared with such Blues greats as Howlin' Wolf, Jesse Fuller, Reverend Gary Davis, Sonny Terry, and Brownie McGhee.  Throughout his long career he has also played/appeared with The Levee Breakers, Davy Graham, Bert Jansch, John Renbourn, Paul Simon, Roy Harper, Al Stewart, Sandy Denny, Strawbs, Velvet Opera, Ralph McTell, and Paul Brett.  He was also highly regarded as one of the best guitar repairers in the United Kingdom. He designed the 'JJ' series and the best selling 'Sandpiper' range of guitars made by Aria.

Discography
 Levee Breakers - Decca EP - 1960s
 Velvet Opera - Ride a Hustler's Dream CBS - 1970
 Joyce's Choice Mixture - Black Lion - 1976
 Acoustic Power (with Paul Brett) - Fretdancer - 2000
 Statesboro Blues - Fretdancer - 2004

1933 births
2004 deaths
British folk guitarists
British male guitarists
Elmer Gantry's Velvet Opera members
20th-century British guitarists
20th-century British male musicians